Lévis or Levis may be:

Geography

Canada
Lévis, Quebec
Lévis (electoral district) (1967–2004), a federal electoral district in Quebec
Lévis (provincial electoral district), a provincial electoral district in the Chaudière-Appalaches region of Quebec
Levis-Lauzon, a former city in Quebec
Lévis—Lotbinière, a federal electoral district in Quebec

France
Levis, Yonne, a commune in Bourgogne-Franche-Comté
Lévis-Saint-Nom, a commune in the Yvelines département
Lévis-Saint-Nom, a commune in Île-de-France
Lurcy-Lévis, a commune in Auvergne

United States
Levis, Wisconsin, a town
Levis, Jackson County, Wisconsin, an unincorporated community

People
House of Lévis, antique noble French family
François de Gaston, Chevalier de Lévis (1719–1787), French soldier best known for his command in Canada in 1760
Levis of Jerusalem, a 2nd-century Jewish Christian bishop
 Will Levis (born 1999), American football player

Military
Fort Lévis, a former French fortification, now submerged in the St. Lawrence River, near Ogdensburg, New York, U.S.
Lévis Forts, a series of three forts in Lévis, Quebec
HMCS Lévis (K115), a 190 Royal Canadian Navy Flower-class corvette
HMCS Lévis (K400), a 190 Royal Canadian Navy River-class frigate

Other
Levis (motorcycle), a now defunct British motorcycle manufacturer
Levi's, a brand of denim clothing
Levi's Stadium, a stadium in Santa Clara, California, U.S.
Levis Formation, a geologic formation in Quebec, Canada

See also
 Leavis, a surname
 Levi (disambiguation)